Charles Ernest Hackett (16 April 1885 – 27 March 1963) was an Australian rules footballer who played with Collingwood in the Victorian Football League (VFL).

Notes

References
 Football: Championship of Australia: Meeting of the "Magpies", The (Adelaide) Register, (Saturday, 15 October 1910), p.11.
 Collingwood Football Team: Victorian Champions, 1910, The Referee, (Wednesday, 19 October 1910), p.13.

External links 

Charlie Hackett's profile at Collingwood Forever

1885 births
1963 deaths
Australian rules footballers from Melbourne
Collingwood Football Club players
People from Brunswick, Victoria